The Affair at Grover Station is a short story by Willa Cather. It was first published in Library in June 1900 in two installments, and reprinted in the Lincoln Courier one month later. The story is about a geological student asking an old friend of his about the recent murder of a station agent.

Plot summary
The outer narrator meets with his old friend Rodgers by Sterling, Colorado, and asks about the murdered agent at Grover station. Rodgers explains that on 31 December there was supposed to be a ball at Cheyenne, Wyoming. His friend Larry asked him to ask Helen if she would be available to go with him. Helen replied that she had told Mr Freymark she would go with him, but she would cancel as Larry took precedence over him. Freymark then went to the station and overheard the two men make arrangements as to sending her flowers, and left saying he had heard what he wanted to hear. Later, Larry didn't turn up and Rodgers went to pick up Helen and told her Larry was late. At the ball, she danced with Rodgers until Freymark showed up and she danced with him. By the end of the night, Larry's spaniel Duke came hurtling at Freymark, who soon disappeared from the place. The next day, Rodgers went about the station and then up to Grover, Colorado. There, he found a blood stain on Larry's bed but thought it must have been nosebleed. During the night however, he got woken up by what looked like Larry's ghost, writing on the chalk board. The next morning, he realised the ghost had written the number of a train, where Larry's body was to be found in Omaha. Upon seeing the body, Rodgers realised the hands were stained by chalk. By then, Freymark had gone, never to be found again. The Division Superintendent did not believe him, after Rodgers admitted to drinking brandy that night.

Characters
The outer narrator, unnamed. He went to Princeton University with Rodgers and is doing geological research off Sterling, Colorado, where he meets with Rodgers after years apart.
Terrapin Rodgers. He went to Princeton University and now works at the railroad office at Cheyenne, Wyoming.
Lawrence O'Toole, the murdered agent of Grover Station. Rodgers calls him Larry.
Miss Helen Masterson. She went to Wellesley and lived in Washington, D.C. many years.
Mr Freymark He lived in Paris many years and therefore speaks several European languages. He likes to gamble at card games. Although he pretends to be a Jew, he is the son of a Chinese slavegirl his father bought when he was living there.
John J. Masterson, Helen's father. He was a United States senator from Wyoming.
Harry Burns, a journalist for The Times and a cousin of Larry's. He is the one who found out about Freymark's scandalous birth.
The dispatcher from Holyoke, Colorado
Connelly, the station conductor.
Helena, a friend of Helen's.
Laramie, a friend of Helen's.

Allusions to other works
The Bible, with Jacob, Laban, and Padan-aram.

Allusions to actual history
Charles Stewart Parnell is said to have been Larry's hero.

Literary significance and criticism
The plotline was partly taken from an 1893 short story by Dorothy Canfield Fisher. Moreover, it has been noted for its trope of the grotesque, which will reappear in Cather's later novels.

The story may have been inspired by Willa Cather's 1898 visit to Cheyenne, Wyoming, where her brother Douglass at the railroad station. Moreover, Cather's sister has said the story was written with his help.

The trope of the ghost has been deemed Jamesian.

Freymark seems to be a throwback to Yung in A Son of the Celestial, Larry to Reggie in "The Fear That Walks by Noonday". The story has also been compared to My Ántonia insofar as both pieces use an outer narrator and they open with a scene on a train.

Adaptation 
The story was adapted for BBC Radio 4 in 1997 by Jonathan Holloway, with Kerry Shale as Rodgers, Tom Watt as Freymark and Stuart Milligan as the narrator (here named as Will Carter). This version expands the story, with further details of Freymark's business interests and a climax in which Rodgers and the narrator revisit the station and see the ghost, which will continue to haunt the location while Freymark still lives. It was rebroadcast by BBC Radio 4 Extra in January 2023.

References

External links
Full Text of Part One and Full Text of Part Two] at the Willa Cather Archive
 
 [https://www.bbc.co.uk/programmes/m001hgjz The Affair at Grover Station'' audio play adaptation at BBC Radio 4 Extra

1900 short stories
Short stories by Willa Cather
Works originally published in Library (journal)
Literature first published in serial form